National Highway 70 (NH 70) was a National Highway in Northern India linking Jalandhar in Punjab to Mandi in Himachal Pradesh. After renumbering of all national highways by National Highway Authority of India in 2010, the old NH 70 has now been subsumed in new National Highway 3 (India) or NH 3 and there is no NH 70 now.

Route
 Hoshiarpur
 Hamirpur
 Dharmapur
 Kotli

See also
 List of National Highways in India (by Highway Number)
 List of National Highways in India
 National Highways Development Project

References

External links
NH network map of India

70
70
Transport in Jalandhar
National highways in India (old numbering)
Transport in Manali, Himachal Pradesh